The Battle of Bud Bagsak was a battle during the Moro Rebellion phase of the Philippine–American War fought between June 11 and June 15, 1913. The defending Moro fighters were fortified at the top of Mount Bagsak on the island of Jolo, Sulu. The attacking Americans were led by General John 'Black Jack' Pershing. The Moros were entirely annihilated, including their leader, Datu Amil.

Background

In March 1913, Datu Amil and 1,500 warriors negotiated with the Sultan of Sulu and other Moros allied with the Americans, pledging to surrender their weapons.  Two months later, having retreated to Bud Bagsak with his entire population of 6,000-10,000 in the Lati Ward, he told the Americans to "come on and fight".

Noticing the Moros only fled to Bud Bagsak when provoked by government troops, General John J. Pershing devised a policy of keeping the troops in their island garrisons in the hopes the women and children would come down from the mountain cottas (fortified earthworks which were surrounded by deep ditches and camouflaged pits containing bamboo shafts on which to impale their enemies ).  At the same time, Pershing secretly landed his force at the coastal town of Bun Bun, three and a half miles from Bud Bagsak.  Pershing's force consisted of the 51st and 52nd Companies of Moro Scouts from Basilan and Siasi, besides the Philippine Scouts from Jolo and fifty troopers from the 8th Cavalry Regiment.

The horseshoe-shaped volcanic crater, open on the northwest at a knoll called Languasan, was protected by five cottas, Bunga, Bagsak, Puhagan, Matunkup and Puyacabao, ranging from 1,440 to 1,900 feet in elevation.

Battle
Pershing made Languasan his first objective as a place for his artillery and to block any escape, sending Major George C. Shaw with Company M of the 8th Infantry and the 40th Company of Philippine Scouts.  Pershing also sent Capt. George Charlton and his 51st Moros to attack Matunkup while Capt. Taylor Nichols' Philippine Scouts attacked Puyacabao.  By 12:20 PM, Matunkup was in American hands, and earned 2nd Lt. Louis Mosher a Medal of Honor.  Puyacabao fell by 12:30 PM.  That ended the first day of fighting, 11 June.

Early on the morning of 12 June, the American artillery fired on Puhagan while marksmen fired on its interior, killing Datu Amil. Pershing then ordered Capt. Patrick Moylan to attack Bunga with the 24th and 31st Scouts, taking it by 1:30 PM.  Pershing, James Lawton Collins, and a ten-man escort scouted Bagsak, which convinced Pershing to bring up his artillery on 14 June and attack from the south.

The attack began in Sunday morning fog, 15 June, with mountain howitzers and Charlton's Moros advancing at 9 AM.  When the assault stalled, Pershing joined other American officers in the forefront of danger, helping stop a Moro counterattack.  The final assault on the cotta occurred at 5 PM and Bagsak was captured after three and a half hours.

Aftermath
General Pershing in a letter to his wife, wrote: "The fighting was the fiercest I have ever seen. They are absolutely fearless, and once committed to combat they count death as a mere incident."

See also
First Battle of Bud Dajo

References

External links
The New York Times (March 8, 1914) "PHILIPPINE HONOR ROLL. Officer and Six Enlisted Men Likely to Get Merit Certificate"
 "Bud Bagsak (Philippines), Battle of", in Spanish-American & Philippine–American Wars, Jerry Keenan, ed. (ABC-CLIO, 2001) pp52–53

Moro Rebellion
Bud Bagsak
Bud Bagsak
History of Sulu
Bud Bagsak
1913 in the Philippines
June 1913 events